Robert William Hamilton may refer to:

 Robert Hamilton (Liberal politician) (1867–1944), Scottish Member of Parliament for Orkney and Shetland
 Robert Hamilton (archaeologist) (1905–1995), British archaeologist and academic
 Robert William Hamilton Jr. (1930–2011), American physiologist
 Robert W. Hamilton (judge) (1899–1981), Justice of the Supreme Court of Texas